Zurab Anjaparidze (born April 12, 1928 – April 12, 1997) was a Soviet and Georgian tenor. People's Artist of the USSR (1966).

Biography
A native of Kutaisi and a graduate of the Tbilisi State Conservatoire (where he was taught by David Andguladze, a renowned vocal pedagogue and a one-time leading tenor of the Tbilisi Opera), Andjaparidze came to conquer the Soviet capital with a star-caliber professional potential: besides a magnificent voice, charisma and solid vocal training, he also had the stage record of seven seasons at the Tiflis Imperial Theater, where he performed a series of lead tenor roles. This was truly an impressive foundation since the Tbilisi Opera was recognized as one of the Soviet Union's top five theaters, with celebrated masters gracing its stage.

Arriving at the Bolshoi in 1959, Andjaparidze remained the theater's number one tenor until his departure in 1970. His exceptionally beautiful voice, striking stage presence, and fiery temperament all immediately propelled Andjaparidze through the top ranks and made him into the sole and inimitable master of the tenor domain. Bolshoi directors eagerly assigned him to the key repertoire productions that would make vocalists' dreams - Carmen, Aida, Rigoletto, La Traviata, Boris Godunov, Iolanthe. He also sang the lead roles in the most significant theater premiers of the time, ones like Faust, Don Carlo and The Queen of Spades. His constant partners on the Moscow stage included such great Russian opera singers as Irina Arkhipova, Galina Vishnevskaya, Tamara Milashkina, Pavel Lisitsian and Ivan Petrov, among others. According to many contemporaries, he reached the height of his Italian repertoire when performing Radames in Verdi's Aida - never before or after Andjaparidze had anyone seen such a brilliant Radames on the Moscow opera scene. Andjaparidze's most lasting work during his Moscow period, one that won him international acclaim, came in the role of Hermann in Tchaikovsky's The Queen of Spades. A Bolshoi tour performance of this opera at the La Scala in 1964, left one Italian newspaper to remark: "Zurab Andjaparidze was a revelation for the Milanese public. This singer has a strong, sonorous and even voice that concedes nothing to the most revered singers of the Italian opera stage."

Back in Georgia, Andjaparidze performed a multifaceted repertoire at the Tbilisi State Opera that included a large variety of Georgian operas - Abesalom and Eteri, Daisi, and Latavra by Paliashvili, Taktakishvili's Mindia, Lagidze's Lela, and other works. He also created memorable characters of Otello and Canio that still resonate on the Tbilisi Theater stage to this day. The tenor once even served as the theater's director, although according to his daughter, renowned pianist Eteri Andjaparidze, his heart was never really into this work. "He was never too drawn to administrative assignments," she says. "After all, all his subordinates were also his friends, and he never felt comfortable 'directing' his friends." Andjaparidze also did some teaching, first as Professor at the Tbilisi Conservatory and then as Head of the Musical Theater Department at the Tbilisi Theater Institute.

The memory of the "Soviet Franco Corelli" (as he was once dubbed by the Italian press) today lives on in the memories of his colleagues, enthusiastic admirers of his great talent, and - perhaps few in number but remarkable in artistic value - recordings of Russian, Italian and Georgian operas.

External links

References

1928 births
1997 deaths
Soviet male opera singers
20th-century male opera singers from Georgia (country)
People's Artists of the USSR
Recipients of the Order of the Red Banner of Labour